Imre Szitás (born  September 4, 1961 in Mosonmagyaróvár, Győr-Moson-Sopron) is a retired male hammer thrower from Hungary, who represented his native country at the 1988 Summer Olympics in Seoul, South Korea. He set his personal best (80.60 metres) on July 11, 1988 in Szombathely.

Achievements

References
 sports-reference

1961 births
Living people
Hungarian male hammer throwers
Athletes (track and field) at the 1988 Summer Olympics
Olympic athletes of Hungary
People from Mosonmagyaróvár
Sportspeople from Győr-Moson-Sopron County